Enrico Aliceno Washington (born May 30, 1978) is an American former professional baseball infielder. He played in Major League Baseball (MLB) for the St. Louis Cardinals and in the Chinese Professional Baseball League (CPBL) for the Uni-President 7-Eleven Lions. He graduated from Jones County High School in 1996.

Career 
The Pittsburgh Pirates selected Washington in the 10th round of the 1997 Major League Baseball Draft out of Jones County High School. Washington played six seasons in the Pirates organization, but was unable to make the team. In 2002, he was left off the Pirates' big-league roster and thus was available for selection in baseball's Rule 5 draft, where he was taken by the San Diego Padres. Washington played in the Padres' system in 2003 and 2004, advancing to Triple-A, but did not make the big-league club and in 2004 was granted free agency. He then signed with the Tampa Bay Devil Rays and played in their farm system in 2005, then was released by Tampa Bay and signed by the Cardinals, where he spent 2006 and 2007 in the minors.

In 2008, just shy of his 30th birthday, after ten years and 3,980 at bats in the minor leagues, Washington finally made the majors when the Cardinals selected him to be on their big-league roster as a backup infielder.

He was optioned to Triple-A Memphis on April 21, 2009.

Washington signed with the Uni-President 7-Eleven Lions of the Chinese Professional Baseball League before the start of the 2009 season. At the start of the 2010 season, Washington signed with the Kansas City T-Bones of the American Association of Independent Professional Baseball, and re-signed with them for 2011. Washington played for the Gary SouthShore RailCats of the American Association in 2012.

References

External links

1978 births
Living people
African-American baseball players
American expatriate baseball players in Taiwan
Major League Baseball infielders
St. Louis Cardinals players
Uni-President 7-Eleven Lions players
Gulf Coast Pirates players
Erie SeaWolves players
Augusta GreenJackets players
Hickory Crawdads players
Lynchburg Hillcats players
Altoona Curve players
Portland Beavers players
Mobile BayBears players
Montgomery Biscuits players
Springfield Cardinals players
Memphis Redbirds players
Gulf Coast Cardinals players
Kansas City T-Bones players
Baseball players from Georgia (U.S. state)
Gary SouthShore RailCats players
21st-century African-American sportspeople
20th-century African-American sportspeople